Madge Allan is a former English international lawn bowler.

Bowls career
Allan won a bronze medal in the Women's fours at the 1986 Commonwealth Games in Edinburgh with Barbara Fuller, Brenda Atherton and Mary Price.

References

English female bowls players
Living people
Commonwealth Games medallists in lawn bowls
Commonwealth Games bronze medallists for England
Bowls players at the 1986 Commonwealth Games
Year of birth missing (living people)
Medallists at the 1986 Commonwealth Games